Newkirk may refer to:

People
Ingrid Newkirk (born 1949), British-American animal rights activist
Anastacia Newkirk (born 1968), American singer-songwriter
Don Newkirk, musician and record producer
Floyd Newkirk (1908–1976), Major League Baseball pitcher
Matthew Newkirk (1794–1868), American railroad executive
Mike Newkirk (born 1986), American and Canadian football defensive end

Places
Newkirk, Oklahoma, a city in Oklahoma, United States
Newkirk, Pennsylvania
Newkirk Township, Michigan, a civil township in Michigan, United States
New York City Subway stations:
Newkirk Plaza, in Brooklyn at East 16th Street; serving the  trains
Newkirk Avenue–Little Haiti, in Brooklyn at Nostrand Avenue; serving the  trains
Newkirk Viaduct, former name of Gray's Ferry Bridge in Philadelphia, Pennsylvania
Newkirk House, the oldest surviving building in Jersey City, New Jersey
Newkirk Homestead, in upstate New York